Highway Robbery may refer to:
 Highway robbery
 "Highway Robbery" (song), a 1988 song by Tanya Tucker
 Highway Robbery (Guilty Simpson and Small Professor album), a 2013 album by Guilty Simpson and Small Professor
 Highway Robbery (Freeway and The Jacka album), a 2014 album by rappers The Jacka and Freeway
 "Highway Robbery", a song by The Dillinger Escape Plan on their album Miss Machine

See also
 Robbery (disambiguation)